Llactan (possibly from Quechua llaqta, place) is an archaeological site in Peru.

References 

Archaeological sites in Peru
Archaeological sites in Amazonas Region